Sphenophorus brunnipennis (common name - La Plata weevil) is a beetle in the Dryophthoridae family.

It was first described by Ernst Friedrich Germar in 1824 as Calandra brunnipennis.. He describes it as living in Buenos Aires.

S. brunipennis arrived  in Australia from South America, and was found to have been established in Perth and Brisbane by the 1920s, and it appears to be spreading. It has also been introduced into New Zealand.

Habitat
The larvae of S. brunipennis feed on the roots of sedges and grasses.

References

Curculionidae

Insects of South America
Insects of Australia

Beetles described in 1824